The Dunn Solar Telescope is a unique vertical-axis solar telescope, in Sunspot, New Mexico located at Sacramento Peak, New Mexico. It is the main telescope at the Sunspot Solar Observatory, operated by New Mexico State University in partnership with the National Solar Observatory through funding by the National Science Foundation, the state of New Mexico and private funds from other partners. The Dunn Solar Telescope specializes in high-resolution imaging and spectroscopy to help astrophysicists worldwide obtain a better understanding of how the Sun affects the Earth. Completed in 1969, it was upgraded with high-order adaptive optics in 2004 and remains a highly versatile astrophysical observatory which serves as an important test platform for developing new instrumentation and technologies.

Telescope 

The Dunn Solar Telescope specializes in solar high-resolution imaging and spectroscopy. These observations allow solar astronomers worldwide to obtain a better understanding of the Sun. The telescope was inaugurated as the world's premier high spatial resolution optical solar telescope in 1969. With a horizontal rotating 40-foot-wide observing platform, such that instruments do not have to be mounted on the telescope itself, the Dunn Solar Telescope continues to offer a versatile, user-friendly setup. It has two high-order adaptive optics benches to compensate for blurring by Earth's atmosphere. Scientists and engineers use the Dunn to investigate a range of solar activities, often in concert with satellites or rocket launches, and to develop new technologies for the 4-meter Daniel K. Inouye Solar Telescope.

Like an iceberg, only a part of the telescope's bulk is visible above ground. The optical path starts at a heliostat on top of a  tower and continues  more underground to the primary mirror. It then returns to one of six quartz optical windows in the floor of an optical laboratory at ground level. The whole building from top to bottom is a single instrument. The telescope's entire optical system – from the top of the Tower to the base of its underground portion, plus the 40-foot diameter observing room floor – is suspended from the top of the Tower by a mercury float bearing. The bearing, in turn, is hung on three bolts, each only  in diameter. The entire optical and mechanical structure of the telescope is longer than a football field and weighs over 250 tons. The optics are evacuated to eliminate distortion due to convection in the telescope that would otherwise be caused by the great heat produced by focusing the light of the sun. A unique feature of the telescope is its approach to image derotation: the entire  telescope and  optics lab, 250 tons total, rotates suspended from a mercury float bearing at the top of the tower.

Despite the size and weight, much of the telescope can be controlled and monitored from a single control room, off to one side of the main instrument observing table.

Instruments 

The Dunn Solar Telescope has a rotating optical bench, which can be configured to multiple observing setups, depending on the requirements of the science under study. The four most widely used instruments, often used together in one complex observing set up are:

 Facility InfraRed Spectropolarimeter (FIRS)

The Facility IR Spectropolarimeter is a multi-slit spectropolarimeter specifically for the Dunn Solar Telescope to study magnetism on the solar surface. The instrument samples adjacent slices of the solar surface using four parallel slits to achieve high cadence, diffraction-limited, precision spectropolarimetry. Up to four spectral lines at visible and infrared wavelengths, covering four different heights in the solar atmosphere, can be observed simultaneously. It can be optimized to provide simultaneous spectral coverage at visible (3,500 – 10,000 Å) and infrared (9,000 – 24,000 Å) wavelengths through the use of a unique dual-armed design. It was designed to "capture the Fe I 6302 Å and Fe I 15648 Å or He I 10830 linesÅ with maximum efficiency ".

 Spectro-POlarimeter for INfrared and Optical Regions (SPINOR)

The Spectro-POlarimeter for INfrared and Optical Regions performs achromatic lens Stokes polarimetry across several visible and infrared spectral regions. Completed in 2005, it was designed to act as 'experimental oriented' instrument, built with a flexibility to allow for the combination of any many spectral lines, "limited only by practical considerations (e.g., the number of detectors available, space on the optical bench, etc.)" 

 Interferometric BI-dimensional Spectro-polarimeter (IBIS)

The Interferometric BIdimensional Spectropolarimeter (IBIS) -is a dual interferometer, imaging, spectro-polarimeter. It uses a series of precise piezo-electric tuning to rapidly scan selected spectral lines between 550 and 860 nm range. This creates a time series of high-fidelity imaging, spectroscopy, and polarimetry of the Sun. It has a large circular field-of-view combined with high spectral (R ≥ 200 000), spatial ≃ 0.2″), and temporal resolution (several frames per second) 

 Rapid Oscillations in the Solar Atmosphere (ROSA)

The Rapid Oscillations in the Solar Atmosphere (ROSA) instrument is a single-controlled system of 6 imaging fast-readout CCD cameras. The full chip on each camera can be read out 30 frames per second, and all the cameras are triggered from one control system. As such, it provides the ability to image multiple layers of the photosphere and chromosphere simultaneously. At its installation in 2010 it generated up to 12 TByte of data per day  making it one of the largest data sets in ground-based solar astronomy at the time.

In addition, some older instruments are available, although these are now rarely used.

 Universal Birefringent Filter (UBF)
 Advanced Stokes Polarimeter (ASP)
 Diffraction-Limited Spectro-Polarimeter (DLSP)

Scientific discoveries, technologies, and scientists 

Inferring telescope polarization properties through spectral lines without linear polarization. Derks, A., Beck, C., Martínez Pillet, V., 2018. Astronomy and Astrophysics volume 615, A22 (2018)

Adaptation of Dunn Solar Telescope for Jovian Doppler spectro imaging. Underwood, T.A., Voelz, D., Schmider, F.-X., Jackiewicz, J., Dejonghe, J., Bresson, Y., Hull, R., Goncalves, I., Gualme, Pa., Morand, F., Preis O., SPIE Optical Engineering 10401Y (2017)

Solar coronal magnetic fields derived using seismology techniques applied to omnipresent sunspot waves. Jess et al., 2016. Cover Article of Nature Physics, Volume 12 Issue 2, February 2016

Solar Multi-Conjugate Adaptive Optics at the Dunn Solar Telescope Rimmele, T., Hegwer, S., Richards, K., Woeger, F.. , 2008, Multi-Conjugate Adaptive Optics.

Speckle interferometry with adaptive optics corrected solar data Wöger, F., von der Lühe, O., Reardon, K., 2008, Speckle Interferometry.

History 
A design for a Solar Vacuum Tower Telescope was started by the architect and engineer Charles W. Jones in 1963. Construction on the final building started in 1966 under the U.S. Army Corps of Engineers and ended in 1967, at a cost of about $3 million with the architectural firm of Roghlin and Baran, Associates. Richard B. Dunn, for whom the instrument was eventually dedicated, wrote an article in Sky and Telescope about the completion of the instrument in 1969. As quoted from the article
"In our design we wanted most of all to eliminate problems of local seeing, which are discussed at every meeting on solar instrumentation. Solar astronomers worry about turbulence caused by the slot in the observatory dome, heating of the dome surfaces, heating of the telescope, local convection, and turbulence within the optical system...In our case, the dome was eliminated. We put a window high up on a 135-foot pyramidal tower and then evacuated the air from the entire telescope inside the tower. The latter reduces the effects of local convection and the vacuum eliminates the internal turbulence and seeing problems. Also, it provides the comfort of a heated observing room...."

More than half the entire building is underground – the tower extends 136 feet above ground and 220 feet below ground. A vertical vacuum tube is enclosed within the concrete tower with 3-foot-thick walls. An entrance window at the top of the tower, and two mirrors, reflect sunlight down the vacuum tube where it is reflected off the 64 inches primary mirror. The primary mirror acts to focus the light, and sends it back up to ground level, where it exits the vacuum tube on the optical benches inside the building. The interior vacuum tube of more than 250 tons is suspended by a bearing that contains 10 tons of mercury. This bearing allowing the entire 250 ton vacuum tube to be rotated, compensating for the apparent rotation of the image as the Sun rises into the sky.

The tower telescope was originally dedicated on October 15, 1969, and renamed in 1998 after Richard B. Dunn. A plaque at the facility reads:
"Named in honor of one of solar astronomy's most creative instrument builders, this vacuum tower telescope is the masterpiece of Richard B. Dunn's long scientific career at Sacramento Peak Observatory" (1998). Construction of the vacuum tower used for the DST significantly impacted future solar instruments: So sharp were the images formed from this type of solar telescope, that almost every large solar telescope built since then has been based on the vacuum tower concept".

See also 
 List of solar telescopes
 List of largest optical telescopes in the 20th century

References

External links 
 Dunn Solar Telescope website
 Virtual tour of the DST

Solar telescopes
Optical telescopes
Astronomical observatories in New Mexico
1969 establishments in New Mexico